The Wave or The Waves is the title given to several seascapes painted between 1869 and 1870 by the French painter Gustave Courbet.

Examples
The Waves (1869, Philadelphia Museum of Art)
The Stormy Sea or The Wave (1869, Musée d'Orsay)
The Wave (1870, Musée des beaux-arts d'Orléans)
The Wave (1869, Musée des beaux-arts de Lyon)
The Wave (unknown date, Städelsches Kunstinstitut, Frankfurt)
The Wave (unknown date, National Museum of Western Art, Tokyo, Japan)
The Wave (1870, Am Römerholz, Winterthur)

 

1869 paintings
Paintings by Gustave Courbet
1870 paintings
Paintings in the collection of the Musée d'Orsay
Paintings in the collection of the Museum of Fine Arts of Lyon
Paintings in the collection of the Städel
Paintings in Centre-Val de Loire
Paintings in Japan
Paintings in Winterthur
Water in art